Soo-hyun, also spelled Soo-hyeon, Su-hyeon, Su-hyun, is a Korean unisex given name. Its meaning differs based on the hanja used to write each syllable of the name. There are 67 hanja with the reading "soo" and 35 hanja with the reading "hyun" on the South Korean government's official list of hanja which may be registered for use in given names. People with this name include:

Entertainers
Kim Su-hyeon (born 1970), South Korean actor
Hong Soo-hyun (born 1981), South Korean actress
Claudia Kim (Korean name Kim Soo-hyun, born 1985), South Korean actress
Kwon Soo-hyun (actor) (born 1986), South Korean actor
Choo Soo-hyun (born 1988), South Korean actress
Kim Soo-hyun (born 1988), South Korean actor
Shin Soo-hyun (born 1989), South Korean male idol singer, lead singer of boy band U-KISS
Lee Su-hyun (singer, born 1999), South Korean female singer, main vocals of duo Akdong Musician
Kim Su-hyun (born 2000), also known as Shin, South Korean male singer, member of GHOST9

Sportspeople
Bang Soo-hyun (born 1972), South Korean female badminton player
Kwon Soo-hyun (field hockey) (born 1974), South Korean women's field hockey player
Jeon Soo-hyun (born Jeon Tae-hyun, 1986), South Korean male football goalkeeper (K-League Challenge)
Yoo Soo-hyun (born 1986), South Korean male football midfielder (K-League Challenge)
Jong Su-hyon (born 1996), North Korean ice hockey player
Su-Hyun Oh (born 1996), South Korean-born Australian female golfer

Others
Kim Soo-hyun (writer) (born Kim Soon-ok, 1943), South Korean female writer

See also
List of Korean given names

References

Korean unisex given names